The 2017 KNVB Cup Final was a football match between Vitesse and AZ on 30 April 2017 at De Kuip, Rotterdam. It was the final match of the 2016–17 KNVB Cup competition and the 99th Dutch Cup Final. Vitesse beat AZ 2–0 to secure their first KNVB Cup trophy and win even their first silverware in their 125-year history.

Ricky van Wolfswinkel was Vitesse's hero of the game as he scored both goals in the final 10 minutes of the match.

Route to the final

Match

Details

See also
 Fireworks incident

References

2017
2016–17 in Dutch football
AZ Alkmaar matches
SBV Vitesse matches
April 2017 sports events in Europe
Sports competitions in Rotterdam
21st century in Rotterdam